Bathytoma mitrella is a species of sea snail, a marine gastropod mollusk in the family Borsoniidae.

Description
The shell grows to a length of 12.5 mm.

Distribution
This species occurs in the Caribbean Sea off Yucatan (at depths between 823 m and 1170 m), Mexico, and in the Gulf of Mexico; also off the Lesser Antilles.

References

 Rosenberg, G.; Moretzsohn, F.; García, E. F. (2009). Gastropoda (Mollusca) of the Gulf of Mexico, Pp. 579–699 in: Felder, D.L. and D.K. Camp (eds.), Gulf of Mexico–Origins, Waters, and Biota. Texas A&M Press, College Station, Texas

mitrella
Gastropods described in 1881